Slater is a city in Saline County, Missouri, United States. The population was 1,856 at the 2010 census.

History
Slater was laid out in 1889. A post office called Slater has been in operation since 1878. The community has the name of John F. Slater, a railroad official.

Geography
Slater is located at  (39.221658, -93.062529).

Demographics

2010 census
As of the census of 2010, there were 1,856 people, 785 households, and 469 families living in the city. The racial makeup of the city was 90.1% White, 6.4% African American, 0.2% Native American, 0.4% Asian, 1.2% from other races, and 1.8% from two or more races. Hispanic or Latino people of any race were 2.6% of the population.

There were 785 households, of which 30.3% had children under the age of 18 living with them, 41.7% were married couples living together, 12.5% had a female householder with no husband present, 5.6% had a male householder with no wife present, and 40.3% were non-families. 34.1% of all households were made up of individuals, and 17.4% had someone living alone who was 65 years of age or older. The average household size was 2.30 and the average family size was 2.94.

The median age in the city was 43 years. 23.2% of residents were under the age of 18; 7.1% were between the ages of 18 and 24; 22.1% were from 25 to 44; 27.5% were from 45 to 64; and 20.2% were 65 years of age or older. The gender makeup of the city was 49.2% male and 50.8% female.

2000 census
As of the census of 2000, there were 2,083 people, 895 households, and 539 families living in the city. The population density was 1,439.1 people per square mile (554.7/km). There were 1,072 housing units at an average density of 740.6 per square mile (285.4/km). The racial makeup of the city was 87.04% White, 9.60% African American, 0.19% Native American, 0.19% Asian, 0.05% Pacific Islander, 1.01% from other races, and 1.92% from two or more races. Hispanic or Latino people of any race were 1.63% of the population.

There were 895 households, out of which 28.0% had children under the age of 18 living with them, 42.9% were married couples living together, 12.5% had a female householder with no husband present, and 39.7% were non-families. 36.5% of all households were made up of individuals, and 21.9% had someone living alone who was 65 years of age or older. The average household size was 2.26 and the average family size was 2.88.

In the city the population was spread out, with 23.2% under the age of 18, 9.6% from 18 to 24, 25.1% from 25 to 44, 20.2% from 45 to 64, and 21.9% who were 65 years of age or older. The median age was 40 years. For every 100 females there were 92.3 males. For every 100 females age 18 and over, there were 86.0 males.

The median income for a household in the city was $25,270, and the median income for a family was $36,281. Males had a median income of $25,969 versus $18,526 for females. The per capita income for the city was $12,863. About 13.5% of families and 18.2% of the population were below the poverty line, including 24.4% of those under age 18 and 18.6% of those age 65 or over.

Education
Public education in Slater is administered by Slater School District. As of 2019, the district is falling behind state standards in multiple educational categories.

Slater has a lending library, the Slater Public Library.

Media
Slater has a weekly newspaper, the Slater Main Street News, formerly called the Slater News-Rustler. The News-Rustler proved to be a unique name among community newspapers, though that was not the intention. The town previously had two weeklies, The News and The Rustler, published on different days of the week. After the town's population peaked, then declined, in the first half of the 20th century, the two publications merged, creating the unusual name.

Notable natives and residents
Joe Kleine - member of the gold medal 1984 U.S. Olympic basketball team; 15-year NBA career
Felice Lyne (1887–1935) - born in Slater; one of the great international opera singers of the early twentieth century
Steve McQueen - actor; lived on Thomson Lane periodically during his childhood; attended Orearville Elementary School

References

External links
 Historic maps of Slater in the Sanborn Maps of Missouri Collection at the University of Missouri

Cities in Saline County, Missouri
Cities in Missouri